Alexandersson is a surname. Notable people with the surname include:

Daniel Alexandersson (born 1978), Swedish footballer
Freyr Alexandersson (born 1982), Icelandic footballer and manager
Helmer Alexandersson (1886–1927), Swedish composer and violinist
Joakim Alexandersson (born 1976), Swedish footballer
Lennart Alexandersson (born 1947), Swedish footballer
Niclas Alexandersson (born 1971), Swedish footballer
Rúnar Alexandersson (born 1977), Icelandic artistic gymnast
Tommy Alexandersson (born 1948), Swedish mass murderer
Tove Alexandersson (born 1992), Swedish orienteer and ski-orienteer

See also
 Alexanderson

Swedish-language surnames
Patronymic surnames